{| 
|+Smeli
{{Infobox ship image
|Ship image=
|Ship caption=Smelis sister submarine Osvetnik underway in 1930
}}

|}Smeli (Daring) was the second of the  diesel-electric submarines built by Ateliers et Chantiers de la Loire, Nantes, France for the navy of the Kingdom of Serbs, Croats and Slovenes (later Yugoslavia). She was launched in 1928, and was built to a partial double hull Simonot design similar to the French s.

Prior to World War II she participated in several cruises to Mediterranean ports. During the German-led Axis invasion of Yugoslavia in April 1941, she was captured by Italian forces at the Bay of Kotor. Initially designated N2, her armament was changed and her conning tower modified. Due to her age and shallow diving depth, when she was commissioned into the Regia Marina as Antonio Bajamonti'''; her service was limited to training and experimentation. She was scuttled at La Spezia in Liguria by the Italians in September 1943 the day after the Italian surrender.

Description and construction
Yugoslav naval policy in the interwar period lacked direction until the mid-1920s, although it was generally accepted that the Adriatic coastline was effectively a sea frontier that the naval arm was responsible for securing with the limited resources made available to it. In 1926, a modest ten-year construction program was initiated to build up a force of submarines, coastal torpedo boats, torpedo bombers and conventional bomber aircraft to perform this role. The  submarines were intended to meet part of this challenge.Smeli was built for the Kingdom of Serbs, Croats and Slovenes (later Yugoslavia) by the Ateliers et Chantiers de la Loire company (ACL) at Nantes, France. Her partial double hull design was based on plans by ACL's chief engineer, G. Simonot, and was similar to the French s. Her Serbo-Croatian name translates as "Daring".

For surface running, the Osvetnik-class boats were powered by two MAN (Maschinenfabrik) diesel engines which were rated at  that drove two propeller shafts. When submerged, the propellers were driven by two Nancy electric motors generating . They were armed with six  torpedo tubes (four bow-mounted, two stern-mounted), one  gun, and one  anti-aircraft gun.

Service historySmeli was the second of her class, and the fourth submarine of the navy of the Kingdom of Serbs, Croats and Slovenes (later the Royal Yugoslav Navy). She was launched on 1 December 1928. She and Osvetnik arrived in the Bay of Kotor on 9 December 1929. In 1932, the British naval attaché reported that Yugoslav ships were engaging in few exercises, manoeuvres or gunnery training due to reduced budgets. In October 1934, Smeli visited Bizerte in the French protectorate of Tunisia, and the Kelibia Roads off the coast of Tunisia. In August and September 1937, Smeli, along with the British-made submarine Hrabri and the depot ship Zmaj, visited Greece, including the port of Piraeus, and the islands of Crete and Corfu.

When the German-led Axis invasion of Yugoslavia began on 6 April 1941, she was in the Bay of Kotor on the southern Adriatic coast along with the three other submarines of the Submarine Division. On 17 April she was captured by the Italian XVII Corps at the Bay of Kotor. Still in good condition, she was taken as war booty, and initially designated N2. She was refitted and modernised at Pola in the upper Adriatic, which involved the replacement of some of her armament and modifications to her conning tower. She was commissioned by the Italians as the  Antonio Bajamonti'', named after the 19th-century politician and mayor of the Dalmatian port of Split. Despite her stability when submerged and good diving rate, her age and shallow diving depth limited her uses to training and experimentation. She was scuttled by the Italians at La Spezia in Liguria on 9 September 1943, the day after the Italian surrender.

See also 
List of ships of the Royal Yugoslav Navy

Notes

References

Books

 
 
 
 
 
 
 

1928 ships
World War II submarines of Yugoslavia
World War II submarines of Italy
Submarines of the Royal Yugoslav Navy
Osvetnik-class submarine
Ships built in France
Naval ships of Yugoslavia captured by Italy during World War II
Scuttled vessels
Maritime incidents in September 1943